The Mauser Model 1914 is a semi-automatic pistol made by Mauser. A derivative of the .25 caliber Model 1910 designed by Josef Nickl, it uses 32 ACP ammunition.

In 1934, the Model 1914 was superseded by the simpler Model 1934. Mauser 1914 pistols were used by the German police and military during both World Wars.

Variants 
The first variant of the Model 1910 was the “Side Latch”, which featured a rotating side-latch just above the trigger which enabled the cover over the side of the lockwork to be removed for cleaning. The second variant was the “New Model” typically referred to as the “Model 1910/14” because it first appeared in 1914. The original side-latch model created some potential problems when field stripped as the trigger could be removed, but would be difficult to replace because of the spring pressure on it. The New Model eliminated this issue and provided some other changes to the lockwork including improvements to the interrupter mechanism, and the magazine and slide stop mechanisms. The New Model's change to the striker mechanism also made it easier to determine if the pistol was cocked.

The pistol was single action, and striker fired, with the trigger connected to a bell crank lever which rotated around its center to disengage from the striker sear, allowing it to fly forward under spring pressure and discharge the cartridge.

Operation 
To operate the pistol it must first be opened, but the slide cannot be opened unless a magazine is inserted. If an empty magazine is inserted then the slide can be pulled back and will lock in place. If the empty magazine is removed the slide will remain locked open: however, if an empty magazine is inserted and pushed home the slide will close.
If the magazine is loaded with cartridges then when it is inserted into the pistol and pushed all the way home the slide will fly forward chambering a cartridge. This was a very convenient feature ensuring the speediest reload as there was no need to operate the slide to get the pistol into action, as soon as the loaded magazine was inserted the slide would automatically close and the pistol was good to go. So the design was very well thought out.

The action of the “Model 1914” was largely the same as that of the “New Model” 6.35mm pistols and featured the same improvements to the trigger and interrupter mechanisms, and the magazine mechanisms that blocked the slide open when the magazine was empty, and prevented the pistol from being fired if the magazine was removed.

References

External links 
Small Arms of WWI Primer 010: German Mauser 1914 Pistol Covers history and details of the pistol.
https://revivaler.com/the-mauser-models-1910-and-1914-pistols/ Covers history and details of the Mauser 1910 Model and the Mauser 1914 Model

Mauser semi-automatic pistols
.25 ACP semi-automatic pistols
.32 ACP semi-automatic pistols
Weapons and ammunition introduced in 1914